Liu Bili is a Chinese lightweight rower. 

At the 1996 World Rowing Championships, she won gold in the lightweight four. At the 1998 World Rowing Championships, she came fourth in the lightweight quad sculls.

References

Chinese female rowers
Year of birth missing (living people)
World Rowing Championships medalists for China
Asian Games medalists in rowing
Asian Games gold medalists for China
Rowers at the 1998 Asian Games
Medalists at the 1998 Asian Games
Living people